In mathematics, and specifically differential geometry, a connection form is a manner of organizing the data of a connection using the language of moving frames and differential forms.

Historically, connection forms were introduced by Élie Cartan in the first half of the 20th century as part of, and one of the principal motivations for, his method of moving frames. The connection form generally depends on a choice of a coordinate frame, and so is not a tensorial object. Various generalizations and reinterpretations of the connection form were formulated subsequent to Cartan's initial work. In particular, on a principal bundle, a principal connection is a natural reinterpretation of the connection form as a tensorial object. On the other hand, the connection form has the advantage that it is a differential form defined on the differentiable manifold, rather than on an abstract principal bundle over it. Hence, despite their lack of tensoriality, connection forms continue to be used because of the relative ease of performing calculations with them. In physics, connection forms are also used broadly in the context of gauge theory, through the gauge covariant derivative.

A connection form associates to each basis of a vector bundle a matrix of differential forms. The connection form is not tensorial because under a change of basis, the connection form transforms in a manner that involves the exterior derivative of the transition functions, in much the same way as the Christoffel symbols for the Levi-Civita connection. The main tensorial invariant of a connection form is its curvature form. In the presence of a solder form identifying the vector bundle with the tangent bundle, there is an additional invariant: the torsion form. In many cases, connection forms are considered on vector bundles with additional structure: that of a fiber bundle with a structure group.

Vector bundles

Frames on a vector bundle

Let E be a vector bundle of fibre dimension k over a differentiable manifold M.  A local frame for E is an ordered basis of local sections of E.  It is always possible to construct a local frame, as vector bundles are always defined in terms of local trivializations, in analogy to the atlas of a manifold. That is, given any point x on the base manifold M, there exists an open neighborhood U ⊂ M of x for which the vector bundle over U is isomorphic to the space U × Rk: this is the local trivialization. The vector space structure on Rk can thereby be extended to the entire local trivialization, and a basis on Rk can be extended as well; this defines the local frame. (Here, R is intended to mean the real numbers , although much of the development here can be extended to modules over rings in general, and to vector spaces over complex numbers  in particular.)

Let e = (eα)α=1,2,...,k be a local frame on E.  This frame can be used to express locally any section of E.  For example, suppose that ξ is a local section, defined over the same open set as the frame e. Then

where ξα(e) denotes the components of ξ in the frame e.  As a matrix equation, this reads

In general relativity, such frame fields are referred to as tetrads. The tetrad specifically relates the local frame to an explicit coordinate system on the base manifold M (the coordinate system on M being established by the atlas).

Exterior connections

A connection in E is a type of differential operator

where Γ denotes the sheaf of local sections of a vector bundle, and Ω1M is the bundle of differential 1-forms on M.  For D to be a connection, it must be correctly coupled to the exterior derivative.  Specifically, if v is a local section of E, and f is a smooth function, then

where df is the exterior derivative of f.

Sometimes it is convenient to extend the definition of D to arbitrary E-valued forms, thus regarding it as a differential operator on the tensor product of E with the full exterior algebra of differential forms.  Given an exterior connection D satisfying this compatibility property, there exists a unique extension of D:

such that

where v is homogeneous of degree deg v.  In other words, D is a derivation on the sheaf of graded modules Γ(E ⊗ Ω*M).

Connection forms
The connection form arises when applying the exterior connection to a particular frame e.  Upon applying the exterior connection to the eα, it is the unique k × k matrix (ωαβ) of one-forms on M such that

In terms of the connection form, the exterior connection of any section of E can now be expressed. For example, suppose that ξ = Σα eαξα.  Then

Taking components on both sides,

where it is understood that d and ω refer to the component-wise derivative with respect to the frame e, and a matrix of 1-forms, respectively, acting on the components of ξ.  Conversely, a matrix of 1-forms ω is a priori sufficient to completely determine the connection locally on the open set over which the basis of sections e is defined.

Change of frame
In order to extend ω to a suitable global object, it is necessary to examine how it behaves when a different choice of basic sections of E is chosen.  Write ωαβ = ωαβ(e) to indicate the dependence on the choice of e.

Suppose that e is a different choice of local basis.  Then there is an invertible k × k matrix of functions g such that

Applying the exterior connection to both sides gives the transformation law for ω:

Note in particular that ω fails to transform in a tensorial manner, since the rule for passing from one frame to another involves the derivatives of the transition matrix g.

Global connection forms
If {Up} is an open covering of M, and each Up is equipped with a trivialization ep of E, then it is possible to define a global connection form in terms of the patching data between the local connection forms on the overlap regions.  In detail, a connection form on M is a system of matrices ω(ep) of 1-forms defined on each Up that satisfy the following compatibility condition

This compatibility condition ensures in particular that the exterior connection of a section of E, when regarded abstractly as a section of E ⊗ Ω1M, does not depend on the choice of basis section used to define the connection.

Curvature

The curvature two-form of a connection form in E is defined by

Unlike the connection form, the curvature behaves tensorially under a change of frame, which can be checked directly by using the Poincaré lemma.  Specifically, if e → e g is a change of frame, then the curvature two-form transforms by

One interpretation of this transformation law is as follows.  Let e* be the dual basis corresponding to the frame e.  Then the 2-form

is independent of the choice of frame.  In particular, Ω is a vector-valued two-form on M with values in the endomorphism ring Hom(E,E).  Symbolically,

In terms of the exterior connection D, the curvature endomorphism is given by

for v ∈ E.  Thus the curvature measures the failure of the sequence

to be a chain complex (in the sense of de Rham cohomology).

Soldering and torsion
Suppose that the fibre dimension k of E is equal to the dimension of the manifold M.  In this case, the vector bundle E is sometimes equipped with an additional piece of data besides its connection: a solder form.  A solder form is a globally defined vector-valued one-form θ ∈ Ω1(M,E) such that the mapping

is a linear isomorphism for all x ∈ M.  If a solder form is given, then it is possible to define the torsion of the connection (in terms of the exterior connection) as

The torsion Θ is an E-valued 2-form on M.

A solder form and the associated torsion may both be described in terms of a local frame e of E.  If θ is a solder form, then it decomposes into the frame components

The components of the torsion are then

Much like the curvature, it can be shown that Θ behaves as a contravariant tensor under a change in frame:

The frame-independent torsion may also be recovered from the frame components:

Bianchi identities
The Bianchi identities relate the torsion to the curvature. The first Bianchi identity states that

while the second Bianchi identity states that

Example: the Levi-Civita connection
As an example, suppose that M carries a Riemannian metric. If one has a vector bundle E over M, then the metric can be extended to the entire vector bundle, as the bundle metric. One may then define a connection that is compatible with this bundle metric, this is the metric connection.  For the special case of E being the tangent bundle TM, the metric connection is called the Riemannian connection. Given a Riemannian connection, one can always find a unique, equivalent connection that is torsion-free. This is the Levi-Civita connection on the tangent bundle TM of M.

A local frame on the tangent bundle is an ordered list of vector fields , where , defined on an open subset of M that are linearly independent at every point of their domain.  The Christoffel symbols define the Levi-Civita connection by

If θ = , denotes the dual basis of the cotangent bundle, such that θi(ej) = δij (the Kronecker delta), then the connection form is

In terms of the connection form, the exterior connection on a vector field  is given by

One can recover the Levi-Civita connection, in the usual sense, from this by contracting with ei:

Curvature
The curvature 2-form of the Levi-Civita connection is the matrix (Ωij) given by

For simplicity, suppose that the frame e is holonomic, so that .  Then, employing now the summation convention on repeated indices,

where R is the Riemann curvature tensor.

Torsion
The Levi-Civita connection is characterized as the unique metric connection in the tangent bundle with zero torsion. To describe the torsion, note that the vector bundle E is the tangent bundle. This carries a canonical solder form (sometimes called the canonical one-form, especially in the context of classical mechanics) that is the section θ of  corresponding to the identity endomorphism of the tangent spaces.

Assuming again for simplicity that e is holonomic, this expression reduces to
,
which vanishes if and only if Γikj is symmetric on its lower indices.

Given a metric connection with torsion, once can always find a single, unique connection that is torsion-free, this is the Levi-Civita connection. The difference between a Riemannian connection and its associated Levi-Civita connection is the contorsion tensor.

Structure groups
A more specific type of connection form can be constructed when the vector bundle E carries a structure group.  This amounts to a preferred class of frames e on E, which are related by a Lie group G.  For example, in the presence of a metric in E, one works with frames that form an orthonormal basis at each point.  The structure group is then the orthogonal group, since this group preserves the orthonormality of frames.  Other examples include:
 The usual frames, considered in the preceding section, have structural group GL(k) where k is the fibre dimension of E.
 The holomorphic tangent bundle of a complex manifold (or almost complex manifold).  Here the structure group is GLn(C) ⊂ GL2n(R).  In case a hermitian metric is given, then the structure group reduces to the unitary group acting on unitary frames.
 Spinors on a manifold equipped with a spin structure.  The frames are unitary with respect to an invariant inner product on the spin space, and the group reduces to the spin group.
 Holomorphic tangent bundles on CR manifolds.

In general, let E be a given vector bundle of fibre dimension k and G ⊂ GL(k) a given Lie subgroup of the general linear group of Rk.  If (eα) is a local frame of E, then a matrix-valued function (gij): M → G may act on the eα to produce a new frame

Two such frames are G-related.  Informally, the vector bundle E has the structure of a G-bundle if a preferred class of frames is specified, all of which are locally G-related to each other.  In formal terms, E is a fibre bundle with structure group G whose typical fibre is Rk with the natural action of G as a subgroup of GL(k).

Compatible connections
A connection is compatible with the structure of a G-bundle on E provided that the associated parallel transport maps always send one G-frame to another.  Formally, along a curve γ, the following must hold locally (that is, for sufficiently small values of t):

for some matrix gαβ (which may also depend on t).  Differentiation at t=0 gives

where the coefficients ωαβ are in the Lie algebra g of the Lie group G.

With this observation, the connection form ωαβ defined by

is compatible with the structure if the matrix of one-forms ωαβ(e) takes its values in g.

The curvature form of a compatible connection is, moreover, a g-valued two-form.

Change of frame
Under a change of frame

where g is a G-valued function defined on an open subset of M, the connection form transforms via 

Or, using matrix products:

To interpret each of these terms, recall that g : M → G is a G-valued (locally defined) function.  With this in mind,

where ωg is the Maurer-Cartan form for the group G, here pulled back to M along the function g, and Ad is the adjoint representation of G on its Lie algebra.

Principal bundles
The connection form, as introduced thus far, depends on a particular choice of frame.  In the first definition, the frame is just a local basis of sections.  To each frame, a connection form is given with a transformation law for passing from one frame to another.  In the second definition, the frames themselves carry some additional structure provided by a Lie group, and changes of frame are constrained to those that take their values in it.  The language of principal bundles, pioneered by Charles Ehresmann in the 1940s, provides a manner of organizing these many connection forms and the transformation laws connecting them into a single intrinsic form with a single rule for transformation.  The disadvantage to this approach is that the forms are no longer defined on the manifold itself, but rather on a larger principal bundle.

The principal connection for a connection form
Suppose that E → M is a vector bundle with structure group G.  Let {U} be an open cover of M, along with G-frames on each U, denoted by eU.  These are related on the intersections of overlapping open sets by

for some G-valued function hUV defined on U ∩ V.

Let FGE be the set of all G-frames taken over each point of M.  This is a principal G-bundle over M.  In detail, using the fact that the G-frames are all G-related, FGE can be realized in terms of gluing data among the sets of the open cover:

where the equivalence relation  is defined by

On FGE, define a principal G-connection as follows, by specifying a g-valued one-form on each product U × G, which respects the equivalence relation on the overlap regions.  First let

be the projection maps.  Now, for a point (x,g) ∈ U × G, set

The 1-form ω constructed in this way respects the transitions between overlapping sets, and therefore descends to give a globally defined 1-form on the principal bundle FGE.  It can be shown that ω is a principal connection in the sense that it reproduces the generators of the right G action on FGE, and equivariantly intertwines the right action on T(FGE) with the adjoint representation of G.

Connection forms associated to a principal connection
Conversely, a principal G-connection ω in a principal G-bundle P→M gives rise to a collection of connection forms on M.  Suppose that e : M → P is a local section of P.  Then the pullback of ω along e defines a g-valued one-form on M:

Changing frames by a G-valued function g, one sees that ω(e) transforms in the required manner by using the Leibniz rule, and the adjunction:

where X is a vector on M, and d denotes the pushforward.

See also
 Ehresmann connection
 Cartan connection
 Affine connection
 Curvature form

Notes

References

 Chern, S.-S., Topics in Differential Geometry, Institute for Advanced Study, mimeographed lecture notes, 1951.
 
 
 
 
 
 
 
 
 

Connection (mathematics)
Differential geometry
Fiber bundles
Maps of manifolds
Smooth functions